This is the discography of Mexican singer-songwriter Juan Gabriel. Widely recognized as the "King of Latin Pop", Gabriel has sold over 100 million records worldwide, making him Mexico's best-selling artist of all time. Billboard ranked him as the 7th Greatest Latin Artist of all time. Gabriel has achieved 7 No. 1 songs on Hot Latin Songs chart and 6 No. 1 albums on Latin Pop Albums chart. According to Neilsen Music, he has sold 3 million albums in the United States since 1991.

Los Duo was the best-selling Latin album of 2015, moving 138,000 units in the US. Recuerdos, Vol. II still is recognized as the Top-selling Latin album of all time in Mexico with sales of 8 million copies worldwide.

Discography

Studio albums 

1971: El Alma Joven... (RCA Records)
1972: El Alma Joven Vol.II (RCA Records)
1973: El Alma Joven Vol.III (RCA Records)
1974: Juan Gabriel con el Mariachi Vargas De Tecalitlán (RCA Records)
1975: 10 Éxitos de Juan Gabriel (RCA Records)
1976: A Mi Guitarra (RCA Records)
1976: Juan Gabriel con Mariachi Vol. II (RCA Records)
1977: Te Llegará Mi Olvido (RCA Records)
1978: Siempre en Mi Mente (RCA Records)
1978: Espectacular (RCA Records)
1978: Mis Ojos Tristes (RCA Records)

1979: Me Gusta Bailar Contigo (Ariola Records)
1980: Recuerdos (Ariola Records)
1980: Juan Gabriel Con Mariachi (Ariola Records)
1980: Ella (RCA Records)
1981: Con Tu Amor (Ariola Records)
1982: Cosas De Enamorados (Ariola Records)
1983: Todo (Ariola Records)
1984: Recuerdos, Vol.II (Ariola)
1986: Pensamientos (RCA Ariola)
1994: Gracias por Esperar (Sony BMG)
1995: El México Que Se Nos Fue (Sony BMG)
1997: Juntos Otra Vez with Rocío Dúrcal (RCA)

1998: Con la Banda...El Recodo with Banda El Recodo (RCA)
1999: Todo Está Bien (RCA)
2000: Abrázame Muy Fuerte (RCA)
2003: Inocente de Ti (Sony Music Latin)
2010: Juan Gabriel (Universal Music Mexico)
2010: Boleros (universal Music y Fonovisa)
2015: Los Dúo (Universal Music y Fonovisa)
2015: Los Dúo, Vol. 2 (Universal Music y Fonovisa)
2016: Vestido de Etiqueta por Eduardo Magallanes (Universal Music y Fonovisa)

Soundtracks 
1979: En Esta Primavera (Juan Gabriel Canta las Canciones de Su Película)
1996: Del Otro Lado del Puente
1997: Te Sigo Amando

Compilations, duets and live albums 

1978: Siempre Estoy Pensando en Ti
1978: Baladas
1981: 15 Exitos de Juan Gabriel
1982: Los 15 Grandes Exitos de Juan Gabriel
1983: Los Mejor De Juan Gabriel Con Mariachi
1985: Juan Gabriel
1986: 15 Anos De Exitos Rancheros
1986: Frente a Frente, Vol. 1
1987: Frente a Frente, Vol. 2
1987: 15 Anos, Baladas, Exitos
1988: Para Ti 14 Exitos Originales
1988: Debo Hacerlo
1990: Juan Gabriel en el Palacio de Bellas Artes
1996: 25 Aniversario: Solos, Duetos Y Versiones Especiales

1998: Celebrando 25 Años de Juan Gabriel: En Concierto en el Palacio de Bellas Artes
1998: Por Mi Orgullo
1999: ¡Románticos! with Rocío Dúrcal
2001: Por Los Siglos
2004: El Unico: Sus Más Grandes Exitos
2006: La Historia del Divo
2007: Los Gabriel... Simplemente Amigos with Ana Gabriel
2008: Los Gabriel: Cantan a México with Ana Gabriel
2008: Los Gabriel... Para ti with Ana Gabriel
2008: El Divo Canta A México
2009: Mis Canciones, Mis Amigos
2010: Mis Favoritas
2010: Boleros
2012: Celebrando
2013: Los Gabriel: Frente A Frente with Ana Gabriel

2014: Mis 40 en Bellas Artes
2014: Mis Número 1...40 Aniversario
2015: Te Acuerdas 20 Nostalgicas
2015: El Divo Y Sus Divas
2016: Juan Gabriel Dúos & Interpretaciones
2016: Mi Historia Musical

Singles

References 

Latin pop music discographies
Discographies of Mexican artists
Regional Mexican music discographies